Stillingia bodenbenderi is a species of flowering plant in the family Euphorbiaceae. It was originally described by Otto Kuntze as Sapium bodenbenderi in 1898. It is native to southeastern Brazil and northeastern Argentina.

References

bodenbenderi
Plants described in 1898
Flora of Brazil
Flora of Argentina